Boys of Summer is an upcoming American adventure fantasy film directed by David Henrie from a script by Cornelius Uliano and Bryan Schulz, and starring Mel Gibson, Mason Thames and Lorraine Bracco.

Synopsis
A boy who suspects a supernatural being is preying on local children enlists the help of an old detective.

Cast

 Mason Thames
 Mel Gibson
 Lorraine Bracco
 Nora Zehetner 
 Abby James Witherspoon
 Julian Lerner
 Noah Cottrell

Production
From a script by Cornelius Uliano and Bryan Schulz set in Martha’s Vineyard about a young boy who begins to suspect a mysterious entity is pursuing the local children. The production is by Nickel City Pictures, Novo Media Group and Pastime Pictures with Mark Fasano and James Henrie producing with John Blandford, and Dan McDonough. Tobias Weymar, Annie Mahoney, Lorenzo Henrie, and Amanda Devine are acting as executive producers. 

It was announced in November 2021 that Gibson and Thames were in the cast and that principal photography was to begin in December 2021 in Wilmington, North Carolina. In January 2022 it was revealed that added to the cast were Lorraine Bracco, Nora Zehetner, Julian Lerner, Abby James Witherspoon and Noah Cottrell whilst Darren Moorman and Scott Pomeroy were added as executive producers. 

Whilst Gibson was filming in Southport, North Carolina he was awarded the keys to the city by the Mayor who declared December 16 to be “Mel Gibson Day”. It was reported that Kevin James and Patrick Renna were also in the area taking part in filming.

Release 
As of June 2022 the film was in post-production. It is set to be released March 2023.

References

External links

Films about witchcraft
American fantasy adventure films
Films shot in North Carolina
Films set in Martha's Vineyard
2020s English-language films